This is a table of notable Australian exchange-traded funds, or ETFs, listed on the Australian Securities Exchange.

See also
List of exchange-traded funds
List of American exchange-traded funds

References

Australian